Cornal Hendricks (born 18 April 1988) is a South African rugby union player for the  in Super Rugby, the  in the Currie Cup and the  in the Rugby Challenge. His usual position is wing.

Career

Boland Cavaliers

He represented local team  through various underage competitions and graduated to the first team.

He remained a first team regular for them over the next five seasons.

Cheetahs / Free State Cheetahs

Stormers / Western Province

However, he was diagnosed with a serious heart condition and failed to make any appearances for them.

Toulon

In December 2016, French Top 14 side  announced the signing of Hendricks until the end of the 2016–17 season. However, a few weeks after announcing this deal, Toulon stated that he would not join the team after all.

Representative rugby

He was also a member of the South Africa Sevens team during the 2011–12 and 2012–13 IRB Sevens World Series. In 2013, he was included in the squad for the 2013 Rugby World Cup Sevens.

In May 2014, Hendricks was one of eight uncapped players that were called up to a Springbok training camp prior to the 2014 mid-year rugby union tests.

He made his debut on 14 June 2014 for the Springboks against Wales in Durban.

Honours
 Currie Cup Player of the Year (2020–21)
 Pro14 Rainbow Cup runner-up 2021
 Currie Cup winner 2020–21, 2021
 United Rugby Championship runner-up 2021-22

Springbok statistics

Test Match Record 

Pld = Games Played, W = Games Won, D = Games Drawn, L = Games Lost, Tri = Tries Scored, Con = Conversions, Pen = Penalties, DG = Drop Goals, Pts = Points Scored

International Tries

References

External links 
 

South African rugby union players
South Africa international rugby union players
Living people
1988 births
Boland Cavaliers players
Cheetahs (rugby union) players
Sportspeople from Paarl
Rugby union wings
South Africa international rugby sevens players
Rugby sevens players at the 2014 Commonwealth Games
Commonwealth Games gold medallists for South Africa
Commonwealth Games rugby sevens players of South Africa
Commonwealth Games medallists in rugby sevens
World Games gold medalists
Competitors at the 2013 World Games
Free State Cheetahs players
Bulls (rugby union) players
Blue Bulls players
Rugby union centres
Rugby union players from the Western Cape
Medallists at the 2014 Commonwealth Games